The Corniferous Limestone is a geologic formation in Ohio. It preserves fossils dating back to the Devonian period.

See also

 List of fossiliferous stratigraphic units in Ohio

References
 

Devonian Ohio